Shoe studs may refer to:
Caulkin  (UK) or calks (USA) on a horseshoe
Cleats on a human shoe
The sole studs of Caulk boots, which are similar to cleats.
Hobnail, special nails driven into the smiles of boots or other footwear to increase traction and improve durability.